The Miss República Dominicana 2010 was celebrated on April 17, 2010 in the Teatro La Fiesta, Hotel Jaragua in Santo Domingo. The winner will represent Dominican Republic in Miss Universe 2010. The Miss RD Continente Americano will enter Miss Continente Américano 2010 and the Miss RD Hispanoamericana will enter Reina Hispanoamericana 2010. The 3rd Runner Up will enter Miss Worldovision 2010. The 4th Runner Up will enter Miss Global Teen 2010. The 5th Runner Up would enter Miss Intercontinental 2010.

Results

Contestants

References

External links
Official website

Miss Dominican Republic
Dominican Republic